The 2018–19 Iowa Hawkeyes men's basketball team represented the University of Iowa during the 2018–19 NCAA Division I men's basketball season. The team was led by ninth-year head coach Fran McCaffery and played their home games at Carver–Hawkeye Arena as members of the Big Ten Conference. The Hawkeyes finished the season 23–12, 10–10 in Big Ten play to finish in sixth place. They defeated Illinois in the second round of the Big Ten tournament before losing to Michigan in the quarterfinals. They received an at-large bid to the NCAA tournament as the No. 10 seed in the South region. There they defeated No. 7-seeded Cincinnati in the First Round before losing to No. 2-seeded Tennessee in the Second Round.

Previous season
The Hawkeyes finished the 2017–18 season 14–19, 4–14 in Big Ten play to finish in a three-way tie for 11th place. As the No. 12 seed in the Big Ten tournament, they defeated Illinois before losing to Michigan in the second round.

Offseason

Departures

2018 recruiting class

Roster

Schedule and results
The 2018–19 season will mark the first time in Big Ten history that the teams will play a 20-game conference schedule, setting a precedent for all Division I basketball. The new schedule will also include a regional component to increase the frequency of games among teams in similar areas. Over the course of a six-year cycle (12 playing opportunities), in-state rivals will play each other 12 times, regional opponents will play 10 times, and all other teams will play nine times. Three in-state series will be guaranteed home-and-homes: Illinois and Northwestern, Indiana and Purdue, and Michigan and Michigan State will always play twice.

|-
!colspan=9 style=| Exhibition

|-
!colspan=9 style=| Regular season

|-
!colspan=9 style=|Big Ten tournament

|-
!colspan=9 style=|NCAA tournament

Source: Schedule

Rankings

^Coaches did not release a Week 1 poll.
*AP does not release post-NCAA Tournament rankings

References

Iowa
Iowa Hawkeyes men's basketball seasons
Hawk
Hawk
Iowa